Bismarck is a 1925 German silent historical film directed by  and starring Franz Ludwig, Erna Morena, and Robert Leffler. It portrays the life of the nineteenth century German Chancellor Otto Von Bismarck. It was part of a popular trend of Prussian films released in Germany after the First World War. It was followed by a second film, also starring Ludwig, in 1927.

The film's sets were designed by the art director Robert Neppach.

Cast

References

Bibliography

External links

1925 films
1920s historical films
1920s biographical films
German historical films
German biographical films
Films of the Weimar Republic
Films directed by Ernst Wendt
German silent feature films
Films set in the 19th century
Films set in Prussia
Cultural depictions of Otto von Bismarck
German black-and-white films
Prussian films
1920s German films